The Roslyn River is a river in Thunder Bay District in northwestern Ontario, Canada. It is in the Great Lakes Basin and is a right tributary of the Namewaminikan River.

Course
The river begins at an unnamed lake in and flows north to Upper Roslyn Lake, where it takes in the three tributary creeks. It continues north, through the Rightwheel Narrows to Roslyn Lake, where it takes in the right tributary Drape Creek. The river heads northwest and reaches its mouth at Gathering Lake on the Namewaminikan River. The Namewaminikan River flows via Lake Nipigon and the Nipigon River to Lake Superior.

Tributaries
Roslyn Lake
Drape Creek (right)
Upper Roslyn Lake
Candy Creek (left)
Klersy Creek (left)
Liver Creek (right)

References

Sources

Rivers of Thunder Bay District